Vaughan was a provincial riding in Ontario, Canada, that was represented in the Legislative Assembly of Ontario between 2007 and 2018.

The riding covered the fast-growing region of Vaughan north of Toronto, Ontario.

It consisted of the part of the City of Vaughan that lies west of Highway 400 and north of Rutherford Road.

In 2018, the district was dissolved into Dufferin—Caledon, King—Vaughan and Vaughan—Woodbridge.

Demographics
According to the Canada 2006 Census

Racial groups: 74.3% White, 9.3% South Asian, 2.7% Latin American, 2.5% Black, 2.4% Southeast Asian, 2.4% Chinese, 1.7% West Asian, 1.7% Filipino, 1.0% Arab 
Languages: 44.8% English, 0.5% French, 54.6% Other 
Religions (2001): 77.0% Catholic, 7.3% Protestant, 2.7% Muslim, 2.6% Christian Orthodox, 2.1% Sikh, 1.6% Hindu, 1.3% Buddhist, 3.9% No religion
Average income: $34,485

Members of Provincial Parliament

Election results

2007 electoral reform referendum

Sources

Elections Ontario Past Election Results

Former provincial electoral districts of Ontario
Politics of Vaughan